Osman Jama Ali (born 1941) is a Somali politician. He was Deputy Prime Minister of the Transitional National Government of Somalia and briefly served as the acting Prime Minister from October 28, 2001 to November 12, 2001. He hailed from the Rer Ainanshe branch of the Habar Yoonis.

See also
 List of prime ministers of Somalia

Notes

1941 births
Living people
21st-century prime ministers of Somalia
Members of the Transitional Federal Parliament